Guzman Gomaz is an Indian Malayalam short film directed by Jayan Naduvathazhath streaming on Hungama Digital Media Entertainment.

Plot
Guzman Gomaz- Fantasy fiction thriller short film set in the backdrop of period gang-wars. When young aspiring gangster Gomaz tries to dethrone the ultimate don Guzman, he encounters unforeseen hurdles in the form of his rival's Immortal Bodyguard Carlos. All he has to do to become the king of the underworld is to kill the unconquerable Don Guzman and his 'Black magic'.

Cast
 Chandradasan as Guzman
 Prasanth V as Gomaz
 Vinodh Mohanan as Danny
 Nakshatara Menon as Daughter
 Tanmay as Little Danny

Awards and nominations
 Semi-Finalist KISFF
 Semi-Finalist NanoCon Film Festival 
 Official Selection Inshort Film Festival
 Official Selection Lift-off Film Festival

References

External links

Indian short films
2010s Malayalam-language films